The Palladium Book of Weapons and Castles of the Orient is a 1984 fantasy role-playing game supplement published by Palladium Books.

Contents
The Palladium Book of Weapons and Castles of the Orient offers detailed information on the various staves, polearms, swords, chain weapons, armor types, castles, and fortifications in use in the Far East, from ancient times to modern times.

Reception
William A. Barton reviewed Weapons and Castles of the Orient in Space Gamer No. 71. Barton commented that "For players of Oriental games such as Bushido or Land of the Rising Sun who want a great deal of detail, this book should prove most valuable. For others with only a passing interest, it probably isn't worth the investment."

References

Fantasy role-playing game supplements
Role-playing game supplements introduced in 1984